Mardig Kevork Mardigian (born 14 March 1992) is a Syrian professional footballer who plays as a centre forward.

Personal life
He is an ethnic Armenian. His father Kevork Mardikian is known as one of the best Syrian football players of all time.

Club career

Syria
Mardik began his professional career in 2009 with Hutteen SC. He scored five goals in his four-seasons long spell at the Latakia based club.

Bahrain
After his great performance with Hutteen SC, he earned the praise and received offers from various clubs in the GCC. He finally moved on-loan to Al-Riffa SC in 2012. He scored five goals for the Riffa based club, including one against Al-Nahda Club of Oman in the 2012 GCC Champions League.

Back to Syria
He came back to Syria and his parent club, Hutteen SC. He scored four league goals in the 2012–13 season.

Jordan
He again moved on-loan in 2013 to Jordan, where signed a contract with Amman based club, Al-Jazeera. He scored eight league goals for the club.

Oman
In the same season, he moved on-loan to Oman where he signed a contract with newly promoted side (To Oman Professional League), Sohar SC. This moved turned out to be the best of his career with him scoring eleven league goals for the club, hence becoming the top-scorer of the club and helping the club to stay in the top-division.

On 17 July 2014, he signed a one-year contract with Fanja SC. He made his Fanja SC debut on 12 September 2014 in a 1–0 win over Al-Suwaiq Club. In December 2014, he was released by Fanja SC.

Qatar
On 19 January 2015, he signed a six-month contract with Al-Markhiya Sports Club of Qatargas League.

Career statistics

Club

International 
Scores and results table. Syria's goal tally first:

|}

Honours
Fanja
 Oman Super Cup runner-up: 2014

Al-Shorta
 Iraqi Super Cup: 2022

References

External links
 
 Mardik Mardikian at Goal.com
 
 

1992 births
Living people
People from Latakia
Hutteen Latakia players
Syrian people of Armenian descent
Syrian Christians
Syrian footballers
Armenian footballers
Syria international footballers
Syrian expatriate footballers
Association football forwards
Sohar SC players
Fanja SC players
Oman Professional League players
Expatriate footballers in Bahrain
Syrian expatriate sportspeople in Bahrain
Jordanian Pro League players
Expatriate footballers in Jordan
Al-Faisaly SC players
Al-Jazeera (Jordan) players
Syrian expatriate sportspeople in Jordan
Expatriate footballers in Oman
Syrian expatriate sportspeople in Oman
Expatriate footballers in Qatar
Syrian expatriate sportspeople in Qatar
Al-Markhiya SC players
Al-Arabi SC (Qatar) players
Al-Shorta SC players
2019 AFC Asian Cup players
Syrian Premier League players
Mardikian family